Mater Verborum (or Glosa Salomonis) is a medieval encyclopedical dictionary written in Latin language around 1240. The document is especially renowned for more than 1000 comments written in it in the medieval Czech language. The manuscript is deposited in the Library of the National Museum (Prague), under signature X A 11.

References

External links 
Mater verborum online
Medieval literature
History of literature
Czech manuscripts